Goshen Avenue , also known as Murray Avenue, is one of the principal east–west arterial roads in Visalia, California, United States.  It was named after the community of Goshen.   The name has a biblical origin and generally has come to mean "land of plenty."

Overview
Running  from Lovers Lane in East Visalia to Highway 99 in the district of Goshen, Goshen Avenue is developed throughout most of its span, connecting neighborhoods in West Visalia and East Visalia to Downtown Visalia.  Goshen Avenue follows a railroad spur line that connects Goshen to Visalia.

The avenue is four lanes in width from Giddings Street to Road 76, and the portion between Demaree Road and Road 76 has a raised center median with Valley Oak trees planted in the median.

Transportation
Route 6 of the Visalia Transit runs along Goshen Avenue from the Visalia Transit Center in Downtown Visalia to Highway 99 and Goshen.

Traveling on Goshen Avenue can often be difficult, as it is one of the main thoroughfares for West Visalia residents to Downtown Visalia.  Goshen Avenue often experiences greater traffic when commuters want an alternate route to the Sequoia Freeway.  Nevertheless, throughout the months of August to June (when VUSD school's are in session), congestion can be high.  During the school year, the best time to travel on Goshen Avenue is between 11:00 AM–2:00 PM.  Alternate routes to Goshen Avenue include Ferguson Avenue, a newer road that can be accessed at Mooney Boulevard.

Districts and neighborhoods along Goshen Avenue (east to west)
East Visalia
East Downtown
Downtown Visalia
Visalia Heights
Green Acres
Hyde Park
The Lakes
Industrial Park
Goshen

Points of interest along Goshen Avenue (west-east)
Recreation Park

Major intersections

References

Streets in Visalia, California